Orlando Wright, better known as Musa Kaleem (born January 3, 1921 – March 26, 1988) was an American jazz saxophonist and flautist.

Career 
Wright bought a clarinet in 1937, and by 1939 was touring as a saxophonist with the El Rodgers Mystics of Rhythm, featuring Eddie Jefferson on lead vocals. Early in the 1940s, he began using the name Gonga Musa, and then Musa Kaleem, the name by which he is best known. He played in Pittsburgh often in the 1940s, gigging with Erroll Garner, Mary Lou Williams, and Art Blakey.

In the middle of the decade he toured with Fletcher Henderson, then relocated to New York City and played with Duke Ellington, Count Basie, Jimmie Lunceford, and the Savoy Sultans in the late 1940s. In the 1950s, Kaleem played on cruise ships. Upon his return in the 1960s, he played with James Moody, Coleman Hawkins, and Tiny Grimes. He played again with Jefferson in that decade as well. Kaleem had five children.

Discography
 Tiny Grimes & Coleman Hawkins, Blues Groove (Esquire, 1958)
 Eddie Jefferson, The Jazz Singer (Inner City, 1976)
 James Moody, James Moody (Argo, 1959)
 James Moody, Cookin' the Blues (Argo, 1965)
 Dizzy Reece, Comin' On! (Blue Note, 1960, reissued on CD in 1999)

References

1988 deaths
1921 births
American jazz saxophonists
American male saxophonists
American jazz flautists
Musicians from West Virginia
20th-century American saxophonists
20th-century American male musicians
American male jazz musicians
20th-century flautists